Wild Cub is a Nashville-based indie rock band led by songwriter-composer Keegan DeWitt and multi-instrumentalist Jeremy Bullock. Its supporting members are drummer Dabney Morris, bassist Harry West, and keyboardist and synthesist Eric Wilson. Their song "Thunder Clatter" charted at No. 59 in the UK in August 2013.

History

Formation
Tired of life in Brooklyn, New York, DeWitt declined a promotion and instead resigned from his job in 2008 and moved to Nashville, Tennessee to concentrate on music. In a 2010 interview, DeWitt stated that he moved because "in Brooklyn, the price of living was such that you'd have to be working a full time job, and I found myself putting 50% effort into both that job and my music. Nashville allowed me to put 100% of my effort into music." For a number of years, he wrote film scores. He collaborated with director Aaron Katz on Dance Party USA, Cold Weather, and Quiet City. The last two were selected as New York Times Critics Picks.

In Nashville, DeWitt met multi-instrumentalist Jeremy Bullock, who had previously collaborated with Madi Diaz and Pico vs. Island Trees, and the two founded Wild Cub with Morris, West, and Wilson in early 2012.

Youth
The group's 13-song debut album Youth was self-released in January 2013 via Big Light Recordings; a deluxe version of the album with two new tracks was released on January 21, 2014, via Mom + Pop Music. Recorded in Bullock's home, it was well received in the UK and the US; Scott Kerr of AllMusic called it "jubilant, '80s-inspired synth pop and infectious". The lead single, "Thunder Clatter", was given a positive review by AllMusic but did not chart until August 2013, after it was used in a Bose commercial; it eventually reached number 59 on the UK Singles Chart.

Recent events
Wild Cub's remix of "Symptoms" by Atlas Genius appeared on their 2013 remix album So Electric: When It Was Now (The Remixes).

Wild Cub has performed at SXSW, Bonnaroo, CMJ and other prominent festivals. In January 2014, they performed "Thunder Clatter" on Late Night with Jimmy Fallon and in April 2014 they performed on Conan. In addition, they performed a version of "Crazy in Love" in June 2014 for The A.V. Club A.V. Undercover series.

As of 2017, both Dewitt and Bullock transitioned to the film and TV industry as composers. Their original compositions appeared in 2017 Heart Beats Loud  and 2018 Bombshell: The Hedy Lamarr Story, the latter which premiered at the Tribeca Film Festival. Bullock also composed an episode of the 2018 series, 7 Days Out,  the entire score of the 2020 HBO series, Atlanta's Missing and Murdered: The Lost Children, and the entire score of 2022 I Love My Dad, which won both the Grand Jury and Audience Narrative Feature Competition Award at the 2022 South by Southwest (SXSW) Film and TV Festival.

Discography

Studio albums
 Youth (2014)
01.  Shapeless

02.  Colour

03.  Thunder Clatter

04.  Straight No Turns

05.  Wishing Well

06.  The Water

07.  Drive

08.  Hidden in the Night

09.  Jonti

10.  Wild Light

11.  Summer Fires / Hidden Spells

12.  Streetlights

13.  Windows

14.  Blacktide

15.  Lies

 Closer (2017)
01.  Magic

02.  I Fall Over

03.  Speak

04.  Clicks

05.  Wait

06.  Somewhere

07.  Mirror

08.  Not With You

09.  Fire

10.  Rain

11.  Go

References

Indie rock musical groups from Tennessee
Musical groups from Nashville, Tennessee
Mom + Pop Music artists